Fatality is a supervillainess in the DC Comics universe. She was created by Ron Marz and first appeared in Green Lantern (vol. 3) #83 in February 1997.

Publication history
After debuting in a three part storyline in Green Lantern (vol. 3) #83-85 (February–April 1997), the character returned for many additional appearances. She joined the title team in Green Lantern: New Guardians in issue #1 (September 2011).

Fictional character biography
The eldest child of the planet Xanshi's ruling family, the girl who would one day call herself Fatality was sent off-world to be educated by the Warlords of Okaara. Xanshi is destroyed due to a miscalculation by Green Lantern John Stewart, making Fatality her world's sole survivor. Learning of Xanshi's fate, she leaves Okaara and dedicates herself to becoming the deadliest warrior in all the universe. Remaining ignorant of Stewart's identity, she swears vengeance on all Green Lanterns.

When the Green Lantern Corps is rendered powerless, Fatality views the last Green Lantern, Kyle Rayner, as her ultimate prize. Their conflict takes them from Earth to a desolate planetoid, where during combat she discovers Stewart was to blame for Xanshi's destruction. Fatality seemingly perishes in the battle, though no body (save a severed arm) is recovered.

Fatality later appears on Earth, having acquired a prosthetic arm and a Qwardian yellow power ring. She again fights Kyle Rayner, who convinces her to remove the yellow ring. The Qwardians had booby trapped the ring, causing it to explosively teleport away after being removed. This destroyed Fatality's (remaining) arm.

After being imprisoned on Earth for a while, she was released by the villain Major Force. She works as a bounty hunter in the Vega System in the Green Lantern Corps: Recharge mini-series.

She later became a member of the Earth-based Secret Society of Super Villains. She is employed as a guard at a torture facility for superhumans under the directorship of The Crime Doctor. While in battle she loses an ear to Vandal Savage's daughter, Scandal, one of the doctor's escaping victims. Scandal swallows the ear.

She was seen among the new Injustice League, with a new Sinestro Corps yellow power ring. Later, she was captured by the Zamarons and experimented upon, and became the Star Sapphire of Sector 1313. Influenced (essentially brainwashed) by the violet light of love, she is now set on forgiving her nemesis, John Stewart, for whom she claims to have romantic feelings. She finds him on Okaara fighting Larfleeze, also known as Agent Orange, and his Orange Lantern Corps, isolating him with crystals and kissing him. She also encourages him to forgive himself as she's absolved herself of her survivor's guilt. Before departing for Zamaron, she tells him that she has forgiven him as well.

Fatality reaches Zamaron just in time to defend the planet against an attack by members of the Sinestro Corps who had come to retrieve their captured female members. Even though she was originally one of them, she had already been converted by the Star Sapphire Corps unlike many of the others.

Fatality went on to become the Star Sapphire representation in the new title Green Lantern: New Guardians, serving as a provisional member of a makeshift 'team' consisting of one representative from each of the seven Corps, including Kyle Rayner of the Green Lantern Corps, Arkillo of the Sinestro Corps, Bleez of the Red Lantern Corps, Saint Walker of the Blue Lantern Corps, Larfleeze's Orange Lantern construct Glomulus, and Munk of the Indigo Tribe. Having learned of Larfleeze's role in banishing the Orrery of Archangel Invictus into another dimension, Fatality returns to Zamaron to recharge, where the Zamarons tell her that someone in this universe must have created the opportunity for Invictus to return.

When Fatality learns the Reach has invaded the Blue Lantern homeworld, she immediately rushes to aid the Blue Lanterns. She then helps John Stewart complete a quest to help the fragments of Mogo essentially bring themselves back to life after Stewart was forced to destroy Mogo during Krona's temporary takeover of the Corps. Following the villainous First Lantern being destroyed and the unemotional Guardians killed off by Sinestro, Fatality begins a relationship with John on Mogo.

After the invasion of Durlans, it is revealed that a Durlan impersonated Fatality undetectably throughout the last few months. After permanently gaining the powers of a Daxamite, the durlan destroyed her Star Sapphire ring. John defeats the imposter and searches for the real Fatality. When John locates and reunites with her on the Durlan prison planet, Fatality attacks him. She tells him that the Zamarons had brainwashed her into becoming a Star Sapphire, forcing her to love him when she actually hated him. She is also offended John did not notice the impersonation. After John refuses to fight, Fatality leaves, telling John that he and the Star Sapphires are her enemies.

Powers and abilities
Fatality has super human strength, speed, reflexes and reactions, and endurance. She has been trained by the fabled Warlords of Okaara and is an expert in all forms of melee combat and the use of many weapons. She is one of the best warriors in the universe.

Fatality has many weapons with which she is an expert. Usually she employs an energy staff. Since losing her arms in a battle with Kyle Rayner, Fatality has acquired bionic arms that provide her with enhanced strength. She has a pair of jet boots that allow her to fly and a starship which she uses to traverse the universe in her attempts to destroy the Green Lantern Corps.

When she was a member of the Sinestro Corps, she used a yellow power ring built on Qward. The ring can create objects based on the wielder's thoughts. The power ring is fuelled by fear instead of willpower. Yellow power rings are weak against Blue Lantern rings. When in their presence, Qwardian rings are drained of their energy. Unlike the green power rings, the yellow ring was never restricted from killing sentient beings.

Now serving as a member of the Star Sapphire Corps, she wears a violet power ring, powered by the emotion of love and built on the planet Zamaron. The capabilities of Star Sapphires appear to be comparable to those of Green Lanterns. They allow the wearer to fly, generate a protective aura (which in the case of Star Sapphires creates distinct feathered and organic shapes), and create violet light constructs. The most notable creation of the violet rings are crystals that encase prisoners from other lantern corps on the Zamaron planet. Over time, the rings of the prisoners trapped in stasis within the crystals are infected with violet energy. After spending enough time inside, the prisoner will emerge as a Star Sapphire.

Other unique abilities of the Star Sapphires' rings include the ability to reveal the wearer's greatest love. They're also able to detect when a loving heart is embattled and in need of aid. By connecting the heart of the ring bearer to a true love in danger, the power of the ring can also act as a tether. Star Sapphires have not been shown to be particularly vulnerable to the powers of other Corps, however as their powers come from one of the farthest two sides of the spectrum their rings have greater control over their personalities.

Other versions
In a possible future, the Book of Oa shows that Yrra would one day marry John Stewart.

In other media
 A six-inch toy of Fatality as a Star Sapphire was included as part of a four-pack in the "Blackest Night" toyline in 2010.
 Fatality appears in DC Universe Online.

References

Characters created by Ron Marz
Comics characters introduced in 1997
DC Comics aliens
DC Comics characters who can move at superhuman speeds
DC Comics characters with superhuman strength
DC Comics extraterrestrial supervillains
DC Comics female supervillains
Fictional amputees
Fictional women soldiers and warriors